Georgios "Giourkas" Seitaridis  (born 4 June 1981) is a Greek former professional footballer who played as a right-back and occasionally as a centre-back. He has last played in 2013 for Greek Superleague side Panathinaikos, having played previously at PAS Giannina, Porto, Dynamo Moscow and Atlético Madrid. He is a former member of the Greece national football team, for which he made a total of 72 international appearances, scoring one goal. He was part of their team which won Euro 2004, for which he was voted into the Team of the Tournament.

Both his grandfather and father, Dimitris Seitaridis, were footballers and eventually managers.

Club career

PAS Giannina
Of Pontic Greek heritage, Seitaridis started his professional career with northern Greek side PAS Giannina, nicknamed Ajax of Epirus, in 1997, becoming an important right full-back for the club. Seitaridis helped the team towards the promotion of the Super League 2 in the 1999–2000 at the Greek Superleague. He made a total of 40 league appearances with PAS Giannina, scoring 5 goals.

Panathinaikos
He was soon spotted by Athens-based club Panathinaikos, and on 12 January 2001 he signed a 5-year contract with them for a total fee of 300 million drachmas. He quickly established himself as a regular player for the team and at the age of 22 he won his first silverware by helping Panathinaikos do the double at the 2003–04 season, winning the 2003–04 Alpha Ethniki and the Greek Cup against rivals Olympiacos.

He scored his first European goal against Manchester United on 7 March 2001, in a game for the second group stage of the 2000–01 UEFA Champions League. In September of the same year, he was named Greek Young Footballer of 2001, along with Pantelis Kafes and Angelos Charisteas.

Porto
On 11 June 2004, a day before the eventually successful UEFA Euro 2004 campaign for Greece, it was rumored that Seitaridis signed for Portuguese side, and at the time Champions League holders, F.C. Porto, for a transfer fee of €3 million. However, the official announcement was made on 26 July 2004, almost a month and a half later, with rumors linking him to Real Madrid in the meantime. He helped the Dragões win the Portuguese SuperCup and Intercontinental Cup of that year.

Dynamo Moscow
On 23 May 2005, he was sold to Russian side Dynamo Moscow for €10 million, following the footsteps of ex-Porto teammates Derlei, Costinha, Maniche and Thiago Silva, who also moved to the Russian club the same year. Soon however, Seitaridis began to show his discomfort at the club, failing to settle in Moscow, and claimed the reasons he wanted to leave was that the weather was different from his native Greece and that he could not adapt to the cold. In his one-year spell at the club, he only managed to make 8 league appearances before deciding to leave.

Atlético Madrid
On 16 June 2006 he was transferred to Atlético Madrid for a fee of €12 million, being the second Greek footballer to play for Atlético after striker Demis Nikolaidis. The latter was the one who convinced him to join the club, together with his ex-Dynamo teammate Costinha who joined Atlético  the same year.  Seitaridis was sent off in the first half of his debut game, in the La Liga opening match away to Racing Santander on 27 August 2006. On 15 October 2006, he received his second red card only six games into the season, as he was cautioned twice in a home league game against Recreativo Huelva.

He scored his first goal for Atlético the following year, on 21 July 2007, in a game against Gloria Bistriţa for the Intertoto Cup. In November 2007, Seitaridis damaged his achilles tendon in a match against UD Almería, which meant he needed to undergo surgery. His period of absence was initially evaluated at about six weeks, but he was ready two and a half months later, in April 2008. Due to his injury problem, he only managed to make 14 league appearances for Atlético in the 2007–08 season.

The 2008–09 season did not start well for Seitaridis, as he lost his place in the first team to new signings Tomáš Ujfaluši and John Heitinga, and his heavy contract meant that Atlético was looking to sell him. Despite that, Seitaridis was a starter in Atlético's opening game, in a 4–0 victory over Málaga CF, and went on to make 14 league appearances that season. On 29 April 2009 however, him and teammate Maniche were suspended by Atlético's president Enrique Cerezo because they failed to appear in an Atlético home match against Sporting Gijón despite not being included in the 18-man squad. Two weeks later on 13 May 2009, it was announced that Seitaridis was released by Atlético a year before his contract was to expire, with a statement on the club's official website reading "Seitaridis is therefore free to negotiate with other clubs who may be interested in signing him".

Return to Panathinaikos
On 10 September 2009, the last day of the Greek transfer period for free agent players, Seitaridis signed a 4-year deal with Panathinaikos, returning to the team after five years. It soon became apparent that Giourkas was unfit and was struggling to re-establish himself due to frequent injuries, missing most of the 2009–10 season's matches. However, on 21 March 2010, he surprisingly returned to the line-up for the big derby against rivals Olympiacos, and despite their defeat, Panathinaikos managed to end the season positively by winning the double. Seitaridis himself didn't appear at the 2009–10 Greek Cup final against Aris Thessaloniki due to injury, but made 2 appearances on the road to the final.

The 2010–11 season started well for Seitaridis, being a starter at Panathinaikos' opening league fixture against Skoda Xanthi on 27 August 2010 and giving a good performance. However, another muscle injury meant that Seitaridis would return at a league game against Panserraikos two months later, on 4 December. Due to the player's poor condition he was placed on the transfer list in January 2011, but despite various offers from foreign teams during the summer transfer period, he stayed at Panathinaikos.

The 2011–12 season was even more disappointing for him, as he was only used for 45 minutes in an away game against Atromitos, where he was substituted at half-time due to poor performance. He played for a second time in an away game against Asteras Tripoli, staying on the pitch a full 90 minutes.

The 2012–13 season started well for Seitaridis, playing as a starter in the first three league matches at the beginning of the season. He also contributed with one assist in Panathinaikos' 2012–13 UEFA Europa League group stage match against Tottenham Hotspur, which ended 1–1.

At the summer of 2013 he didn't renew his contract and left the club.

International career

Youth career
Seitaridis is a former Greece under-21 international, making his debut on 6 October 2000, in a 2002 UEFA Under-21 Championship qualifier against Finland under-21. He participated at the finals of the 2002 UEFA Under-21 Championship in Switzerland, where his team was eliminated from the group stage, having collected one point in three games.

First steps & UEFA Euro 2004
Seitaridis made his international debut with the senior team on 13 February 2002, in an international friendly match against Sweden. He helped Greece qualify to the UEFA Euro 2004 in Portugal for the second time in history, and was also one of the key players during Greece's successful campaign, a win that shocked the footballing world as Greece were considered outsiders before the tournament started. Seitaridis won a penalty at the first match against Portugal as he was knocked down by Cristiano Ronaldo. In the final, he also won the important corner by playing the ball in the center which was blocked from Cristiano Ronaldo. Overall his contributions for the victorious team were recognised by naming him as part of the 23-man UEFA 2004 All-Star squad, together with fellow Greek players Antonis Nikopolidis, Traianos Dellas, Theodoros Zagorakis and Angelos Charisteas.

FIFA Confederations Cup 2005
As a result of the win at Euro 2004, Greece qualified to the 2005 FIFA Confederations Cup in Germany as European champions. Giourkas Seitaridis was a member of the 23-man squad.

UEFA Euro 2008 & 2010 FIFA World Cup
He scored his debut international goal on 2 June 2007 against Hungary in a Euro 2008 qualifying match, helping the Greece national team to qualify to the UEFA Euro 2008 championship. He played twice in the disappointing Euro 2008 campaign for Greece, having been injured during the second game against Russia.

Despite concerns about his fitness, Greece national manager Otto Rehhagel called Seitaridis in his 23-man squad for the 2010 FIFA World Cup. He only played for 90 minutes in the first game of the group stage against South Korea, losing 2–0. After this game, Seitaridis played two consecutive European and a World Cup with Greece national football team.

Career statistics

Club

International goal
Score and result list Greece's goal tally first, score column indicates score after Seitaridis goal.

Honours
PAS Giannina
 Super League 2: 1999–2000

Panathinaikos
 Superleague Greece:2003–04, 2009–10
  Greek Cup: 2003–04, 2009–10

Porto
 Portuguese Super Cup: 2004
 Intercontinental Cup: 2004
 UEFA Super Cup Runner-up: 2004

Greece
European Championship: 2004

Individual
Greek Young Footballer of the year: 2001
 UEFA European Championship Team of the Tournament: 2004

References

External links
 
 FootballDatabase.com statistics for Giourkas Seitaridis

1981 births
Living people
Greek footballers
Greece international footballers
Greece under-21 international footballers
PAS Giannina F.C. players
Panathinaikos F.C. players
FC Porto players
FC Dynamo Moscow players
La Liga players
Atlético Madrid footballers
UEFA Euro 2004 players
2005 FIFA Confederations Cup players
UEFA Euro 2008 players
UEFA European Championship-winning players
Primeira Liga players
Russian Premier League players
Footballers from Piraeus
Super League Greece players
Football League (Greece) players
2010 FIFA World Cup players
Greek expatriate sportspeople in Portugal
Greek expatriate sportspeople in Spain
Greek expatriate sportspeople in Russia
Association football defenders
Pontic Greeks
Greek expatriate footballers
Expatriate footballers in Russia
Expatriate footballers in Spain
Expatriate footballers in Portugal